CNY is the ISO 4217 code for Renminbi, the currency of the People's Republic of China.

CNY may also refer to:
 City of New York, the most populous city in the United States
 CNY (IATA code), for Canyonlands Field airport near Moab in Grand County, Utah, United States
 Chinese New Year, a traditional festival
 Central New York, the central region of upper New York State, United States
 ConnectNY, a consortium of 18 college libraries in New York State

See also
New York City (disambiguation)
NYC (disambiguation)
cony (disambiguation)